Alastor (Ancient Greek: Ἀλάστωρ, English translation: "avenger") refers to a number of people and concepts in Greek mythology:

Alastor, an epithet of the Greek God Zeus, according to Hesychius of Alexandria and the Etymologicum Magnum, which described him as the avenger of evil deeds, specifically familial bloodshed.  As the personification of a curse, it was also a sidekick of the Erinyes. The name is also used, especially by the tragic writers, to designate any deity or demon who avenges wrongs committed by men. In Euripides' play Electra, Orestes questions an oracle who calls upon him to kill his mother, and wonders if the oracle was not from Apollo, but some malicious alastor.  There was an altar to Zeus Alastor just outside the city walls of Thasos.
By the time of the 4th century BC, alastor in Greek had degraded to a generic type of insult, with the approximate meaning of "scoundrel".
Alastor, a prince of Pylos and son of King Neleus and Chloris, daughter of Amphion. He was the brother of Asterius, Deimachus, Epilaus, Eurybius, Eurymenes, Evagoras, Nestor, Periclymenus, Phrasius, Pylaon, Taurus and Pero. When Heracles took Pylos, he killed Alastor and his brothers, except for Nestor. According to Parthenius of Nicaea, he was to be married to Harpalyce, who, however, was taken from him by her father Clymenus.
Alastor, a Lycian warrior who was a companion of Sarpedon. He fought in the Trojan War and was slain by the Greek hero Odysseus during the battle.
Alastorides is a patronymic form given by Homer to Tros, who was probably a son of the Lycian Alastor mentioned above.
Alastor, a Pylian soldier who fought under their leader Nestor during the Trojan War. He remembered for having, together with Mecisteus, carried the wounded Teucer off the battlefield as they later did also with Hypsenor.
Alastor, a black horse belonging to the Greek God Hades. He was one of the four horses drawing Hades's chariot when he rose from the Underworld to bring Persephone down with him. The other three were Orphnaeus, Aethon, and Nycteus.
Alastor, in Christian demonology, came to be considered a kind of possessing entity. He was likened to Nemesis. The name Alastor was also used as a generic term for a class of evil spirits.

See also

 the Alastor Cluster, fictional location of three of Jack Vance's science fiction novels
 Alastor, or The Spirit of Solitude, a poem by Percy Bysshe Shelley
 Alastor, a Crimson Lord from the Japanese light novel series Shakugan no Shana, associated with the titular character.
 Alastor, a character in the Viewtiful Joe series
 Alastor "Mad Eye" Moody, a character in the Harry Potter novels
 Alastor "The Radio Demon", a character in Hazbin Hotel
 Alastor appears in Errementari, in competition with Sartael
 Alastor, a pirate ship featured in Patrick O'Brian's novel The Wine-Dark Sea
 Alastor "The Thunder Sword", a lightning-elemental Devil Arm in the first Devil May Cry video game
 Alastor, pharmaceutical company in Clarice, named after the Greek deity

Notes

References 

 Aeschylus, translated in two volumes. 2. Agamemnon by Herbert Weir Smyth, Ph. D. Cambridge, MA. Harvard University Press. 1926. Online version at the Perseus Digital Library. Greek text available from the same website.
 Apollodorus, The Library with an English Translation by Sir James George Frazer, F.B.A., F.R.S. in 2 Volumes, Cambridge, MA, Harvard University Press; London, William Heinemann Ltd. 1921. ISBN 0-674-99135-4. Online version at the Perseus Digital Library. Greek text available from the same website.
Claudius Claudianus, The Rape of Proserpine translated by Platnauer, Maurice. Loeb Classical Library Volumes 135 & 136. Cambridge, MA. Harvard University Press. 1922.  Online version at Bill Thayer's Web Site
 Euripides, The Complete Greek Drama, edited by Whitney J. Oates and Eugene O'Neill, Jr. in two volumes. 2. Electra, translated by Robert Potter. New York. Random House. 1938. Online version at the Perseus Digital Library.
 Euripides, Euripidis Fabulae. vol. 2. Gilbert Murray. Oxford. Clarendon Press, Oxford. 1913. Greek text available at the Perseus Digital Library.
 Euripides, The Complete Greek Drama, edited by Whitney J. Oates and Eugene O'Neill, Jr. in two volumes. 2. Phoenissae, translated by Robert Potter. New York. Random House. 1938. Online version at the Perseus Digital Library.
 Euripides, Euripidis Fabulae. vol. 3. Gilbert Murray. Oxford. Clarendon Press, Oxford. 1913. Greek text available at the Perseus Digital Library.
 Graves, Robert, The Greek Myths, Harmondsworth, London, England, Penguin Books, 1960. 
Graves, Robert, The Greek Myths: The Complete and Definitive Edition. Penguin Books Limited. 2017. 
Homer, The Iliad with an English Translation by A.T. Murray, Ph.D. in two volumes. Cambridge, MA., Harvard University Press; London, William Heinemann, Ltd. 1924. . Online version at the Perseus Digital Library.
Homer, Homeri Opera in five volumes. Oxford, Oxford University Press. 1920. . Greek text available at the Perseus Digital Library.
 Parthenius, Love Romances translated by Sir Stephen Gaselee (1882-1943), S. Loeb Classical Library Volume 69. Cambridge, MA. Harvard University Press. 1916.  Online version at the Topos Text Project.
 Parthenius, Erotici Scriptores Graeci, Vol. 1. Rudolf Hercher. in aedibus B. G. Teubneri. Leipzig. 1858. Greek text available at the Perseus Digital Library.
 Pausanias, Description of Greece with an English Translation by W.H.S. Jones, Litt.D., and H.A. Ormerod, M.A., in 4 Volumes. Cambridge, MA, Harvard University Press; London, William Heinemann Ltd. 1918. . Online version at the Perseus Digital Library
Pausanias, Graeciae Descriptio. 3 vols. Leipzig, Teubner. 1903.  Greek text available at the Perseus Digital Library.
 Publius Ovidius Naso, Metamorphoses translated by Brookes More (1859-1942). Boston, Cornhill Publishing Co. 1922. Online version at the Perseus Digital Library.
 Publius Ovidius Naso, Metamorphoses. Hugo Magnus. Gotha (Germany). Friedr. Andr. Perthes. 1892. Latin text available at the Perseus Digital Library.
 Sophocles, The Trachiniae of Sophocles edited with introduction and notes by Sir Richard Jebb. Cambridge. Cambridge University Press. 1893. Online version at the Perseus Digital Library.
 Sophocles, Sophocles. Vol 2: Ajax. Electra. Trachiniae. Philoctetes with an English translation by F. Storr. The Loeb classical library, 21. Francis Storr. London; New York. William Heinemann Ltd.; The Macmillan Company. 1913. Greek text available at the Perseus Digital Library.

Demons in Christianity
Epithets of Zeus
Greek gods
Neleides
Personifications in Greek mythology
Achaeans (Homer)
Pylian characters in Greek mythology
Mythology of Heracles
Ancient Greek military personnel
Christianity and Hellenistic religion